The Dictionary of Irish Architects is an online database which contains biographical and bibliographical information on architects, builders and craftsmen born or working in Ireland during the period 1720 to 1940, and information on the buildings on which they worked. Although it is principally devoted to architects, it includes engineers who designed buildings and structures, some builders, some artists and craftsmen, and some amateurs and writers on architectural subjects.

Architects from Britain and elsewhere who never resided in Ireland but designed buildings there are not given full biographical treatment, and only their Irish works are listed. Irish-born architects who emigrated are similarly treated; their careers after their departure from Ireland are not described in detail, and only their Irish works are listed in full.

The Dictionary of Irish Architects was created and compiled in the Irish Architectural Archive over a period of thirty years. It was made publicly available online in January 2009. It remains a work-in-progress with new data added on a regular basis.

References

Online databases
Architecture in Ireland

Biographical dictionaries
Online encyclopedias